Events in the year 2022 in Brazil.

Incumbents

Federal government 
 President: Jair Bolsonaro
 Vice President: Hamilton Mourão

Governors 
 Acre: Gladson Cameli
 Alagoas: Renan Filho
 Amapa: Waldez Góes
 Amazonas: Wilson Lima
 Bahia: Rui Costa
 Ceará: Camilo Santana
 Espírito Santo: Renato Casagrande
 Federal District: Ibaneis Rocha
 Goiás: Ronaldo Caiado
 Maranhão: Flávio Dino
 Mato Grosso: Mauro Mendes
 Mato Grosso do Sul: Reinaldo Azambuja
 Minas Gerais: Romeu Zema
 Pará: Helder Barbalho
 Paraíba: João Azevêdo
 Paraná: Ratinho Júnior
 Pernambuco: Paulo Câmara
 Piauí: Wellington Dias
 Rio de Janeiro: Wilson Witzel (until 30 April); Cláudio Castro (starting 30 April)
 Rio Grande do Norte: Fátima Bezerra
 Rio Grande do Sul: Eduardo Leite
 Rondônia: Marcos Rocha
 Roraima: Antonio Denarium
 Santa Catarina: Carlos Moisés
 São Paulo: João Doria
 Sergipe: Belivaldo Chagas
 Tocantins: Mauro Carlesse

Vice governors 
 Acre: Wherles Fernandes da Rocha
 Alagoas: José Luciano Barbosa da Silva
 Amapá: Jaime Domingues Nunes
 Amazonas: Carlos Alberto Souza de Almeida Filho
 Bahia: João Leão
 Ceará: Maria Izolda Cela de Arruda Coelho
 Espírito Santo: Jacqueline Moraes da Silva
 Goiás: Lincoln Graziane Pereira da Rocha
 Maranhão: Carlos Orleans Brandão Júnior
 Mato Grosso: Otaviano Olavo Pivetta
 Mato Grosso do Sul: Murilo Zauith
 Minas Gerais: Paulo Brant
 Pará: Lúcio Dutra Vale (until 26 April); vacant thereafter
 Paraíba: Lígia Feliciano
 Paraná: Darci Piana
 Pernambuco: Luciana Barbosa de Oliveira Santos
 Piaui: Regina Sousa
 Rio de Janeiro: Cláudio Castro (until 30 April), vacant (starting 30 April)
 Rio Grande do Norte: Antenor Roberto
 Rio Grande do Sul: Ranolfo Vieira Júnior
 Rondônia: José Atílio Salazar Martins
 Roraima: Frutuoso Lins Cavalcante Neto
 Santa Catarina: Daniela Cristina Reinehr
 São Paulo: Rodrigo Garcia
 Sergipe: Eliane Aquino Custódio
 Tocantins: Wanderlei Barbosa Castro

Events

January - March 
January 10 - Capitólio rockfall
January 13 - Landslide destroys historic house in Ouro Preto, Minas Gerais
January 20 – Brazilian drug regulator Anvisa approves the use of the Sinovac Coronavac vaccine for children between the ages of 6 and 11 years.
January 28 - 2022 Brazil floods and landslides
February 15 - 2022 Petrópolis floods
Cracolândia: Police move in to disperse a notorious drug market in Sao Paulo.

April - June 
April 10 - Christ the Protector a new statue of Jesus Christ is constructed in Encantado, Rio Grande do Sul, Brazil. It is 5m taller than the [[Christ the Redeemer (statue)|Christ the Redeemer]]'' statue in Rio de Janeiro
May 24 - 2022 Rio de Janeiro shootout
May 25 - Killing of Genivaldo de Jesus
June - Murder of Bruno Pereira and Dom Phillips: A Brazilian indigenist and a British journalist Dom Phillips are murdered during a trip through the Vale do Javari.

July - September 
July 4 - School bus accident leaves 25 children injured and 1 deceased in Treviso, Santa Catarina
July 8 - Gunman takes advantage of open gate, invades ex's condominium and leaves 3 dead and 2 injured in Recife, capital of Pernambuco
July 9 - A municipal guard and a police officer are shot at a birthday party in Foz do Iguaçu, Paraná.
July 18 - In district of Lapa, Rio de Janeiro, a youngster it is dead for police and ends up closing in protest
July 23 - The central defender Renan, player of team Red Bull Bragantino, it is arrested after being in accident of car and leaving 1 dead in Bragança Paulista, São Paulo.
July 24 - A strong explosion occurs due to a gas leak, which left 4 injured in district of Água Fria, in North Zone of Recife, Pernambuco.

October - December 
October 2 – First round of general election.
October 4 – Fire on several wheels in a neighborhood of São Gonçalo, in the state of Rio de Janeiro, occurs after the death of a suspect after a confrontation with the PM
October 30 – Second round of general election.
Brazilians elect Luiz Inácio Lula da Silva of the Workers' Party as president, with 50.9% of the vote, in the second round of the presidential election, thereby making him the first person to defeat an incumbent running for a second term, the first person to run for a third non-consecutive term, and the oldest person to assume the office of president, at the age of 77.
November 25 – A shooting spree occurs at two schools in Aracruz, Espírito Santo, killing three people and injuring 13 others. The suspect, a 16-year-old boy, is arrested approximately four hours later.

Deaths 
January 23 - Maiquel Falcão (born 1981), mixed martial artist
April 3 - Lygia Fagundes Telles (born 1918), writer
July 4 - Cláudio Hummes (born 1934), Roman Catholic cardinal, archbishop of Fortaleza (1996–1998) and São Paulo (1998–2006), prefect for the Clergy (2006–2010)
July 9 - Wanderley Vallim (born 1936), entrepreneur and politician, governor of the Federal District (1990–1991)
July 10 - Ermano Batista Filho (born 1937), lawyer and politician, Minas Gerais MLA (1991–2007)
July 15 - Luiz of Orléans-Braganza (born 1938), disputed head of the imperial family (since 1981).
July 19 - Eunice Durham (born 1932), anthropologist
December 29 - Edson "Pelé" Arantes (born 1940), formerly known as the King of Soccer

See also 

COVID-19 pandemic in South America
Mercosur
Organization of American States
Organization of Ibero-American States
Community of Portuguese Language Countries

References 

 	

 
Brazil
Brazil
2020s in Brazil
Years of the 21st century in Brazil